WBA may refer to:

Walgreens Boots Alliance, an American drug retail company
Warner Bros. Animation, produces animated films
West Bromwich Albion F.C., an English football club
Western Band Association, a circuit for high school marching bands in California
Williams Boag architects
Wireless Broadband Alliance, an industry association promoting interoperability between operators in the Wi-Fi industry
World Branding Awards, an industry awards for brands
World Basketball Association, a basketball league in the southeastern United States
World Boxing Association, an international organization of professional boxing 
Why–because analysis, a method of accident analysis
WWBA, a radio station in Tampa Bay, Florida
Women's American Basketball Association, a women's basketball league (1992–1995)
World Bodypainting Association, an association for body painters
Finnish Commuter Airlines (ICAO code)